Kade is a town and the capital of Kwaebibirem Municipal, a district in the Eastern Region of south Ghana. Kade has a 2013 settlement population of 16,542 people.

Geography
Kade is the location of an important placer mine, Kade is located 120 km from Accra.

Transport

Train
Kade is the terminus of a Ghana railway branch off the central line, built to serve the Kade mine.

Sports
The football team KADE UNITED F/C is based in this town Kade.

See also 
 Railway stations in Ghana

References 

Populated places in the Eastern Region (Ghana)